Vasheqan (also Romanized as Vāsheqān, Vāshqān, and Vāshaqān; also known as Vāsheqeh, Vashghan, and Wāshghān) is a village in Talkh Ab Rural District, Khenejin District, Farahan County, Markazi Province, Iran. At the 2006 census, its population was 129, in 65 families.

References 

Populated places in Farahan County